This is a list of female individuals that have worked professionally in the field of creating role-playing games, including designers, editors, and artists.

A
Erica Awano

B
Meguey Baker
Donna Barr
Linda M. Bingle
Jean Blashfield Black
Emily Care Boss
Anne Brown - Writer/Editor/Game Designer
Jennifer Brozek - Writer/Game Designer/Editor

C
Michele Carter
Deborah Teramis Christian
Genevieve Cogman
Sue Weinlein Cook

D
Liz Danforth
Ann Dupuis - President of Grey Ghost Games/Writer/Game Designer

F
Emily Fiegenschuh
Crystal Frasier

G
Lee Gold
Rebecca Guay

H
Jess Hartley - Novelist/Writer/Developer/Editor
Andria Hayday
Jennifer Hepler
Carol Heyer
Laura Hickman
Miranda Horner
Heather Hudson

J
Jennell Jaquays
Kij Johnson
Veronica V. Jones

K
Katharine Kerr
Heike Kubasch

L
Laura Lakey
Stephanie Pui-Mun Law
April Lee
Jody Lee
Nicole Lindroos
Stacy Longstreet

M
Diana Magnuson
Julia Martin
Angel Leigh McCoy
Elizabeth McCoy
Anne Gray McCready
Wynn Mercere
Jenna K. Moran - (formerly Rebecca Sean Borgstrom)
Rowena Morrill

N
Sarah Newton
Terese Nielsen
Kate Novak

P
Darlene Pekul
Jessica Price

R
Jean Rabe

S
Lisa Smedman
Caroline Spector
Lisa J. Steele
Lisa Stevens
Anne Stokes

T
Cat Tobin

V
Monica Valentinelli
Valerie Valusek
Susan Van Camp

W
Sue Weinlein Cook
Margaret Weis - TSR's Dragonlance and MWP's Serenity
Jean Wells
Eva Widermann
Robin Wood
Teeuwynn Woodruff
Janny Wurts

Y
Barbara G. Young

References

Designers
Role-playing games
Role-playing games

es:Anexo:Autores de juegos de rol
fi:Luettelo roolipelisuunnittelijoista